Gábor Financsek (born 27 August 1985) is a Hungarian swimmer. He competed in the men's 50 metre breaststroke event at the 2017 World Aquatics Championships.

References

1985 births
Living people
Hungarian male swimmers
Place of birth missing (living people)
Male breaststroke swimmers